Ferreira's spiny tree-rat (Mesomys hispidus) is a spiny rat species found in Bolivia, Brazil, Colombia, Ecuador, French Guiana, Guyana, Peru, Suriname and Venezuela. The etymology of the species name corresponds to the Latin word  meaning bristly.

Systematics

The description of Mesomys hispidus was conducted on a specimen collected by the naturalist Alexandre Rodrigues Ferreira during his travels in Amazonian Brazil, hence the species name. Initially deposited in the Museu Real d'Ajuda of Portugal, it has been brought to Paris in 1808 after the plundering of Lisbon by the armies of Napoleon. Then, in 1817, Anselme Gaëtan Desmarest described the species based on this specimen housed in the National Museum of Natural History (France) of Paris.

Using ancient DNA technology, a portion of the mitochondrial cytochrome b gene has been sequenced from a small skin fragment of this holotype. DNA sequence comparisons then suggested that the specimen was originally obtained in eastern Amazonia north of the Amazon River, most likely in the Brazilian state of Amapá.

References

Mesomys
Mammals of Bolivia
Mammals of Brazil
Mammals of Colombia
Mammals of Ecuador
Mammals of French Guiana
Mammals of Guyana
Mammals of Peru
Mammals of Suriname
Mammals of Venezuela
Rodents of South America
Fauna of the Amazon
Mammals described in 1817
Taxa named by Anselme Gaëtan Desmarest